Sadovoye is a rural locality (a selo) in Pokrovsky Selsoviet, Khasavyurtovsky District, Republic of Dagestan, Russia. The population was 842 as of 2010. There are 24 streets.

Geography 
Sadovoye is located 23 km northeast of Khasavyurt (the district's administrative centre) by road. Novy Kostek is the nearest rural locality.

References 

Rural localities in Khasavyurtovsky District